Hamilton East was a federal electoral district in Ontario, Canada. It was represented in the House of Commons of Canada from 1904 to 2004. It consisted of the eastern part of the city of Hamilton, Ontario. It is considered a working class district.

History
The riding was created in 1903 from parts of Hamilton riding.

Hamilton East initially shall consist of wards 1, 6 and 7 of the City of Hamilton. In 1914, it was redefined as consisting of the part of the city of Hamilton described by a line beginning where Ottawa street meets Burlington Bay, south along Ottawa street, west along Burlington street, south along the division line between lots number five and six of the township of Barton, west along Barton Street, south along Sherman Avenue, west along the brow of the mountain, south along Wentworth Street, west along Aberdeen Avenue, north along Ferguson Avenue, west along King street, north along Hughson street to Burlington Bay.

In 1924, it was redefined as consisting the part of the city of Hamilton lying east of Wellington Street and west of Ottawa Street. In 1933, it was redefined to exclude the part of the city lying south of a line from Wellington Street east along Concession Street, north along Sherman Avenue, east along the brow of the mountain to the city limit. In 1952, it was redefined to consist of the part of the city of Hamilton bounded on the east by Ottawa Street, on the south by the brow of the mountain, on the west by Wellington Street.

In 1966, it was redefined to consist of the part of the City of Hamilton bounded on the south by the brow of the Mountain, on the west by a line from Hamilton Harbour south on Wellington Street, east along Robert Street, south along East Avenue, east along Main Street, south along Wentworth Street to the brow of the Mountain; and bounded on the east by a line from Hamilton Harbour south along Parkdale Avenue, west along the C.N.R. line, south along Strathearne Avenue, west along Roxborough Avenue and Kenilworth Avenue to the brow of the Mountain.

In 1976, it was redefined to consist of the part of the City of Hamilton bounded on the east by Red Hill Creek, on the south by the brow of the Mountain, and on the west by a line drawn north along Sherman Avenue, west along Main Street East, and north along Wentworth Avenue.

In 1987, it was redefined to consist of the part of the City of Hamilton lying within the following limits: commencing at the intersection of the easterly limit of the said city with Queenston Road; thence westerly along Queenston Road to Redhill Creek; thence southwesterly along Redhill Creek to the brow of the Niagara Escarpment; thence northerly and westerly along said brow to the southerly production of Sherman Avenue; thence northerly along said production to and along Sherman Avenue to Cannon Street; thence westerly along Cannon Street to Wentworth Street; thence northerly along Wentworth Street and its northerly production to the northerly limit of the City of Hamilton; thence easterly and southerly along the northerly and easterly limits of said city to the point of commencement.

In 1996, it was redefined to consist of the part of the City of Hamilton bounded by a line drawn from the eastern limit of the city along Queenston Road, south along Redhill Creek, north and west along the brow of the Niagara Escarpment, north along Wentworth Street, west along Main Street, north along Wellington Street, east along Burlington Street, north along the spur line of the Canadian National Railway to the northern city limit.

The electoral district was abolished in 2003 when it was redistributed between Hamilton Centre and Hamilton East—Stoney Creek ridings.

Members of Parliament

This riding has elected the following Members of Parliament:

Election results

|}

|}

|}

|}

|}

|}

|}

|}

On Mr. Rennie's death, 13 October 1930:

|}

|}

|}

|}

|}

|}

|}

|}

|}

|}

|}

|}

|}

|}

|}

|}

   

|}

    

Resignation of Sheila Copps, 1 May 1996:

|}

|}

|}

External links
Federal election results for Hamilton East

Former federal electoral districts of Ontario
History of Hamilton, Ontario